Klokočevac may refer to:

 Klokočevac, a village near Majdanpek, Serbia
 Klokočevac, a village near Bjelovar, Croatia

or:
 Ilovski Klokočevac, a village near Hercegovac, Croatia

See also
 Klokot (disambiguation)
 Klokotnica (disambiguation)